Jani is a 2017 Indian Kannada-language action romance film written and directed by cinematographer P. K. H. Das, in his debut film direction. The film stars Vijay Raghavendra, Milana Nagaraj and Janani Anthony in the lead roles. Suman, Rangayana Raghu, Sadhu Kokila and choreographer Mugur Sundar appear in key supporting roles. The film is produced by J. Janakiram and M. Aravind under Aishwarya Film Productions banner.

The film marks musician Jassie Gift's 25th film as a composer. The project also marks choreographer Chinni Prakash's return to Kannada cinema after 20 years. The film is set to release on 11 August 2017.

Cast
 Vijay Raghavendra as Jani
 Milana Nagaraj
 Janani Anthony
 Suman
 Rangayana Raghu
 Sadhu Kokila
 Shobharaj 
 Sumithra
 Mugur Sundar (guest appearance)
 Chitra Shukla (guest appearance in the song "Bangade Bangade")

Soundtrack

The original soundtrack for the film is composed by Jassie Gift, marking his 25th film. T-Series music label acquired the music album rights.

References

External links
 "Jaani Movie - Vijaya Raghavendra - Dir: Pkh Das - Jessie Gift - Releasing on Aug 11th" 

2017 films
2010s Kannada-language films
2010s romantic action films
Indian romantic action films
2017 directorial debut films